The Albany Group is a geologic group in Texas. It preserves fossils dating back to the Permian period.

See also

 List of fossiliferous stratigraphic units in Texas
 Paleontology in Texas

References
 

Permian System of North America
Geologic groups of Texas